Michael Blake Tillery (born October 9, 1983) is an American politician who has served in the Georgia State Senate from the 19th district since 2017.

References

1983 births
Living people
People from Vidalia, Georgia
Republican Party Georgia (U.S. state) state senators
21st-century American politicians